Ammonium molybdate can refer to:
Ammonium orthomolybdate, (NH4)2MoO4
Ammonium heptamolybdate, (NH4)6Mo7O24, usually encountered as the tetrahydrate
Ammonium phosphomolybdate, (NH4)3PMo12O40
Ammonium tetrathiomolybdate, (NH4)2MoS4 this chemical is used for analysis of chloride in a solution

See also
Ammonium dimolybdate, (NH4)2Mo2O7